Collarenebri Airport  is a small airport  north of Collarenebri, New South Wales, Australia.

See also
List of airports in New South Wales

References

Airports in New South Wales
Collarenebri, New South Wales